The Lost Weekend is a 1945 American film directed by Billy Wilder, and starring Ray Milland and Jane Wyman. It was based on Charles R. Jackson's novel of the same name about an alcoholic writer. The film was nominated for seven Academy Awards and won four: Best Picture, Best Director, Best Actor, and Best Adapted Screenplay. It also shared the Grand Prix at the first Cannes Film Festival, making it one of only three films—the other two being Marty (1955) and Parasite (2019)—to win both the Academy Award for Best Picture and the highest award at Cannes.

On review aggregator Rotten Tomatoes, the film has an approval rating of 97% based on 70 reviews, with an average rating of 8.4/10. The site's critical consensus reads, "Director Billy Wilder's unflinchingly honest look at the effects of alcoholism may have had some of its impact blunted by time, but it remains a powerful and remarkably prescient film." In 2011, The film was selected for preservation in the United States National Film Registry by the Library of Congress as being "culturally, historically, or aesthetically significant."

Plot
On Thursday, alcoholic New York writer Don Birnam is packing for a weekend vacation with his brother Wick. When Don's girlfriend Helen drops by with two tickets for a concert that day, Don suggests that Wick attend with Helen. Knowing they had disposed of all the liquor Don had hidden in the apartment and thinking he has no money for more, they go to the concert.

After finding ten dollars that Wick left for the cleaning lady, Don heads for Nat's Bar, calling in at a liquor store to purchase two bottles of rye on the way.  Don intends to be back home in time to meet Wick and catch their train, but he loses track of time due to his drinking. When he arrives home, he sees Wick leaving and Helen saying she will stay and wait for Don. Don  sneaks back into the flat, where he hides one of his bottles of liquor and drinks the other one.

On Friday, back at Nat's Bar, Nat criticizes Don for treating Helen so badly. Don tells Nat that he intends to write a novel about his battle with alcoholism, called The Bottle. He recalls how he first met Helen at the opera house, where the cloakroom mixed up their coats. He and Helen struck up a romance, and he remained sober during this time. When he goes to meet her parents, he overhears them talking about him being unemployed, wondering if he is good enough for their daughter. He loses his nerve and sneaks off. She goes to his flat, where Wick tries to cover for him, but Don confesses that he is two people: "Don the writer", whose fear of failure causes him to drink, and "Don the drunk" who always has to be bailed out by Wick. Helen devotes herself to helping him.

After telling Nat the story behind his proposed novel, Don heads back home to begin writing it. However, his alcohol cravings get the better of him and he begins a desperate search for the other bottle from the previous night, which he knows he has hidden away somewhere. After failing to find it, he visits another bar, where he is thrown out after trying to steal from a woman's purse because he didn't have enough to pay the bill. Back in his flat, he finds the bottle he had hidden and drinks himself into a stupor.

On Saturday, Don is broke and tries to pawn his typewriter so he can buy more alcohol, but the pawnshops are closed for Yom Kippur. Desperate for money, he visits Gloria, a prostitute who has a crush on him. She gives him some money, but he falls down her stairs and is knocked unconscious.

On Sunday, Don wakes up in an alcoholics' ward where nurse Bim Nolan mocks him and other guests at "Hangover Plaza".  Bim offers to help cure his delirium tremens, but Don refuses help and escapes while the staff are occupied with a raving, violent patient.

On Monday, Don steals a bottle of whisky from a store after threatening the owner, and spends the day drinking. Suffering from delirium tremens, he hallucinates a nightmarish scene in which a bat flies in his window and kills a mouse, spilling its blood. Helen then returns.  Finding Don collapsed and in a delirious state, she stays overnight on his couch.

On Tuesday morning, Don slips out and pawns Helen's coat, the one that had brought them together. She trails him to the pawn shop and learns from the pawnbroker that he traded the coat for his gun, for which he has bullets at home. She races to Don's apartment and interrupts him just before he is about to shoot himself. As she pleads with him, Nat arrives to return Don's typewriter. After Nat leaves, Helen convinces him that "Don the writer" and "Don the drunk" are the same person. He commits to writing his novel The Bottle, dedicated to her, which will recount the events of the weekend. He drops a cigarette into a glass of whiskey to make it undrinkable as evidence of his resolve.

Cast

Production and notable features
Wilder was originally drawn to this material after having worked with Raymond Chandler on the screenplay for Double Indemnity. Chandler was a recovering alcoholic at the time, and the stress and tumultuous relationship with Wilder during the collaboration caused him to start drinking again. Wilder made the film, in part, to try to explain Chandler to himself.

Wilder originally wanted Jose Ferrer for the role of Don, but he turned it down. Charles Brackett's first choice for playing Helen was Olivia de Havilland, but she was involved with a lawsuit that prevented her from being in any film at that time.  It has been said that Katharine Hepburn and Jean Arthur were also considered for the role.

The majority of the film was shot at Paramount studios in Hollywood. Wilder, however, insisted they shoot part of the film on location in New York City to create a distinct sense of realism. On October 1, 1944, Wilder and his small crew began filming in New York, mostly along Third Avenue in Midtown East Manhattan. To further create a realistic atmosphere, Wilder and his crew used hidden cameras, placing them behind boxes or in the back of trucks, and capturing Milland as he walked up 3rd Avenue among actual pedestrians who were unaware a film was being made. The production also had the unprecedented permission to film inside Bellevue Hospital in the alcoholic ward, a request that would be denied to future films. After completing filming in New York, the cast and crew returned to California to resume principal photography, where they recreated several New York locations, including a replica of P.J. Clarke's, a tavern often frequented by author Charles Jackson.

The film also made famous the "character walking toward the camera in a daze as time passes" camera effect.

Once The Lost Weekend was completed, it was shown to a preview audience, who laughed at what they considered Milland's overwrought performance, and the studio actually considered shelving the film. Part of the problem was that the print shown at the preview didn't have Miklós Rózsa's original musical soundtrack, but instead had a temporary track containing upbeat jazz music. However, once the Rózsa score was in place, along with a re-shoot of the last scene, audiences and critics reacted favorably. The film's musical score was among the first to feature the theremin, which was used to create the pathos of alcoholism.

Rights to the film are currently held by Universal Studios, which owns the pre-1950 Paramount sound feature film library via EMKA, Ltd.

The film differs significantly from the book by leaving out the novel's noted homosexual overtones, namely the strong implication that Don Birnam (as was the book's author, Charles Jackson) is a closeted homosexual.

The liquor industry launched a campaign to undermine the film even before its release. Allied Liquor Industries, a national trade organization, wrote an open letter to Paramount warning that anti-drinking groups would use the film to reinstate prohibition. Liquor interests allegedly enlisted gangster Frank Costello to offer Paramount $5 million to buy the film's negative in order to burn it. Wilder quipped that if they’d offered him $5 million, “I would have [burned the negative].”

Reception

Box office performance
The film was a commercial success. Produced on a budget of $1.25 million, it grossed $11 million at the box office, earning $4.3 million in US theatrical rentals.

Academy Awards
At the 18th Academy Awards in May 1946, The Lost Weekend received seven nominations and won in four categories.

Cannes Film Festival
This film also shared the 1946 Grand Prix du Festival International du Film at the first Cannes Film Festival and Milland was awarded Best Actor. To date, The Lost Weekend, Marty (1955), and Parasite (2019) are the only films ever to win both the Academy Award for Best Picture and the highest award at the Cannes Film Festival. (Marty received the Palme d'Or (Golden Palm), which, beginning at the 1955 festival, replaced the Grand Prix du Festival International du Film as the highest award.)

National Film Registry
In 2011, The Lost Weekend was deemed "culturally, historically, or aesthetically significant" by the United States Library of Congress and selected for preservation in the National Film Registry. The Registry said the film was "an uncompromising look at the devastating effects of alcoholism" and that it "melded an expressionistic film-noir style with documentary realism to immerse viewers in the harrowing experiences of an aspiring New York writer willing to do almost anything for a drink."

Adaptations
The Lost Weekend was adapted as a radio play on the January 7, 1946, broadcast of The Screen Guild Theater, starring Milland, Wyman, and Faylen in their original film roles.

On March 10, 1946, three days after winning the Academy Award, Milland appeared as a guest on a radio broadcast of The Jack Benny Show. In a spoof of The Lost Weekend, Milland and Jack Benny played alcoholic twin brothers. Phil Harris, who normally played Jack Benny's hard-drinking bandleader on the show, played the brother who tried to convince Ray and Jack to give up liquor. ("Ladies and gentlemen," said an announcer, "the opinions expressed by Mr. Harris are written in the script and are not necessarily his own.") In the alcoholic ward scene, smart-aleck Frank Nelson played the ward attendant who promised Ray and Jack that they would soon start seeing DT visions of strange animals. When the DT visions appeared (with Mel Blanc providing pig squeals, monkey chatters, and other animal sound effects), Ray chased them off. "Ray, they're gone!", Benny shouted. "What did you do?" Milland replied, "I threw my Oscar at them!"

References

External links

 
 
 
 
 
 The Lost Weekend film review at filmsite.org
 The Lost Weekend on Screen Guild Theater: January 7, 1946

1945 films
1945 drama films
American drama films
American black-and-white films
Best Drama Picture Golden Globe winners
Best Picture Academy Award winners
1940s English-language films
Film noir
Films about alcoholism
Films about writers
Films based on American novels
Films directed by Billy Wilder
Films featuring a Best Actor Academy Award-winning performance
Films featuring a Best Drama Actor Golden Globe winning performance
Films produced by Charles Brackett
Films scored by Miklós Rózsa
Films set in Manhattan
Films set in New York City
Films shot in Los Angeles
Films shot in New York City
Films whose director won the Best Directing Academy Award
Films whose director won the Best Director Golden Globe
Films whose writer won the Best Adapted Screenplay Academy Award
Films with screenplays by Billy Wilder
Films with screenplays by Charles Brackett
Palme d'Or winners
Paramount Pictures films
United States National Film Registry films
1940s American films